The 8th Annual Genie Awards were held on March 18, 1987 to honour Canadian films made the previous year.

The awards were dominated by Denys Arcand's The Decline of the American Empire (Le Déclin de l'empire américain). The show was again held at the Metro Toronto Convention Centre and co-hosted by Helen Shaver, Linda Sorensen and Jean LeClerc.

Nominees and winners

References

Genie
Genie
08